The Mid-American Collegiate Hockey Association (MACHA) is an ACHA club hockey league comprising colleges and universities in the Midwest.

Organizational structure 

The MACHA is made up of three divisions, Gold, Silver, and Bronze. The Gold Division is made up of ten members. The Silver Division is made up of 13 members and is split up into two conferences, the North and West. The Bronze Division is made up of five members. Each division conducts its own playoffs. Some schools field multiple teams in different conference divisions.

Gold Division 
The Gold Division is made up of teams from the Central Region of ACHA Division 2.

Gold Division Champions 
2023- Iowa
2022- Iowa State
2021- N/A (COVID)
2020- Iowa
2019- McKendree
2018- McKendree
2017- McKendree
2016- Southern Illinois-Edwardsville
2015- Missouri State
2014- Missouri State
2013- Southern Illinois-Edwardsville
2012- Missouri

Silver Division 
The Silver Division is made up of teams from the Pacific Region of ACHA Division 3.

North Conference

West Conference

Silver Division Champions 
The MACHA Silver Division has sent several teams to the ACHA Division 3 National Tournament the past few years. The most notable finish was Iowa State in 2012. As the #3 seed from the Pacific Region they won their pool to reach the National semifinals where they lost to eventual champion Adrian College.

2020- Kansas
2019- Nebraska
2018- Nebraska
2017- Iowa State
2016- Marquette
2015- Marquette
2014- Wisconsin-Platteville
2013- Wisconsin-Platteville
2012- Robert Morris-Peoria

Silver Division Nationals Teams 
The MACHA Silver Division has sent several teams to the ACHA Division 3 National Tournament the past few years. The MACHA has had two teams advance to the semifinals. The first was in 2012 when Iowa State, the #3 seed from the Pacific Region, lost to the eventual champion Adrian College. The second was in 2014 when Robert Morris-White, the #4 seed from the Pacific Region, lost to the eventual champion Adrian College. Because Davenport forfeited the 3rd place game Robert Morris was awarded 3rd place.

2019 Host City: Dallas, TX
Milwaukee (Finished 12th)
Nebraska (Finished 15th)

2014 Host City: Coral Springs, FL
Robert Morris-White (Finished 3rd)

2013 Host City: Springfield, MO
Marquette (Finished 10th)
Iowa State (Finished 15th)

2012 Host City: Vineland, NJ
Iowa State (Finished 4th)

2011 Host City: Holland, MI
McKendree (Finished 13th)

Bronze Division 
The Bronze Division is made up of teams from the Pacific Region of ACHA Division 3.

Bronze Division Champions 
2018- McKendree
2017- Northern Illinois
2016- Northern Illinois
2015- Northern Illinois
2012- Robert Morris University Peoria

See also 
 American Collegiate Hockey Association
 List of ice hockey leagues

ACHA Division 2 conferences